Rieder is a German-language surname.

People with the surname Rieder include:

 Anna-Maria Rieder (born 2000), German para alpine skier
 Hermann Rieder (1928–2009), German javelin thrower, trainer and sports scientist
 Josef Rieder (1893–1916), German cyclist
 Tim Rieder (born 1993), German professional footballer

German-language surnames